The black wheatear (Oenanthe leucura) is a wheatear, a small passerine bird that was formerly classed as a member of the thrush family, Turdidae, but is now more generally considered to be an Old World flycatcher of the Muscicapidae.

This large 16–18 cm long wheatear breeds on cliffs and rocky slopes in western north Africa and Iberia. It is largely resident and nests in crevices in rocks laying 3-6 eggs.

The male of this species is all black except a white rump and mainly white tail. The female is similar, but dark brown rather than black.

The similar white-crowned wheatear, Oenanthe leucopyga, also breeds in the African part of the black wheatear's range, but the black wheatear has a black inverted "T" on its white tail, whereas white-crowned has only a black centre to its tail. The black wheatear never has a white crown, but young white-crowned wheatears also lack this feature.

The food of this wheatear is mainly insects. It has a loud thrush-like song.

References

External links
Ageing and sexing (PDF; 2.6 MB) by Javier Blasco-Zumeta & Gerd-Michael Heinze

black wheatear
Birds of Europe
Birds of North Africa
black wheatear
black wheatear